Ciochina is a commune located in Ialomița County, Muntenia, Romania. It is composed of four villages: Bordușelu, Ciochina, Orezu and Piersica.

References

Communes in Ialomița County
Localities in Muntenia